Hulu Kinta is a state constituency in Perak, Malaysia, that has been represented in the Perak State Legislative Assembly.

Demographics

History

Polling districts
According to the gazette issued on 30 March 2018, the Hulu Kinta constituency has a total of 19 polling districts.

Representation history

Election Results

References 

</ref>

Perak state constituencies